
Gmina Słupia is a rural gmina (administrative district) in Skierniewice County, Łódź Voivodeship, in central Poland.

Villages
Gmina Słupia contains the villages and settlements of Bonarów, Bonarów-Działki, Gzów, Krosnowa, Marianów, Modła, Nowa Krosnowa, Podłęcze, Słupia, Słupia-Folwark, Słupia-Pokora, Winna Góra, Wólka-Nazdroje and Zagórze.

Neighbouring gminas
Gmina Słupia is bordered by the gminas of Głuchów, Godzianów, Jeżów, Lipce Reymontowskie and Rogów.

References
Polish official population figures 2006

Slupia
Skierniewice County